Parkston is a city in Hutchinson County, South Dakota, United States. The population was 1,567 at the 2020 census.

As of 2022, Adam Doering is the city's current mayor.

History
The city was named for R. S. Parke, a landowner.  Parkston was founded in 1886.

Geography
Parkston is located at  (43.394269, -97.987279).

Parkston has been assigned the ZIP code 57366 and the FIPS place code 48460.

Demographics

2010 census
As of the census of 2010, there were 1,508 people, 663 households, and 404 families living in the city. The racial makeup of the city was 97.1% White, 0.2% African American, 1.7% Native American, 0.1% Asian, and 0.9% from two or more races. Hispanic or Latino of any race were 0.5% of the population.

There were 663 households, of which 24.6% had children under the age of 18 living with them, 51.9% were married couples living together, 6.0% had a female householder with no husband present, 3.0% had a male householder with no wife present, and 39.1% were non-families. 36.8% of all households were made up of individuals, and 22.5% had someone living alone who was 65 years of age or older. The average household size was 2.15 and the average family size was 2.80.

The median age in the city was 47.6 years. 22.8% of residents were under the age of 18; 4.9% were between the ages of 18 and 24; 19.1% were from 25 to 44; 25.4% were from 45 to 64; and 28% were 65 years of age or older. The gender makeup of the city was 46.8% male and 53.2% female.

2000 census
As of the census of 2000, there were 1,674 people, 699 households, and 448 families living in the city. The population density was 1,839.5 people per square mile (710.3/km2). There were 752 housing units at an average density of 826.4 per square mile (319.1/km2). The racial makeup of the city was 97.79% White, 0.18% African American, 1.55% Native American, and 0.48% from two or more races. Hispanic or Latino of any race were 0.72% of the population.

There were 699 households, out of which 25.2% had children under the age of 18 living with them, 56.8% were married couples living together, 4.7% had a female householder with no husband present, and 35.8% were non-families. 33.9% of all households were made up of individuals, and 23.6% had someone living alone who was 65 years of age or older. The average household size was 2.24 and the average family size was 2.87.

In the city, the population was spread out, with 23.4% under the age of 18, 5.4% from 18 to 24, 21.1% from 25 to 44, 17.9% from 45 to 64, and 32.1% who were 65 years of age or older. The median age was 45 years. For every 100 females, there were 85.2 males. For every 100 females age 18 and over, there were 83.1 males.

As of 2000 the median income for a household in the city was $29,662, and the median income for a family was $39,688. Males had a median income of $29,063 versus $17,500 for females. The per capita income for the city was $15,260. About 3.3% of families and 5.7% of the population were below the poverty line, including 5.2% of those under age 18 and 11.1% of those age 65 or over.

Climate
Humid continental climate is a climatic region typified by large seasonal temperature differences, with warm to hot (and often humid) summers and cold (sometimes severely cold) winters. Precipitation is relatively well distributed year-round in many areas with this climate.  The Köppen Climate Classification subtype for this climate is "Dfa" (Hot Summer Continental Climate).

See also
 List of cities in South Dakota

References

External links

 
 Parkston School District

Cities in Hutchinson County, South Dakota
Cities in South Dakota
Populated places established in 1886
1886 establishments in Dakota Territory